Trevor James Morris (born 3 January 1942) is a New Zealand rugby union player and teacher. A full-back, Morris represented Golden Bay-Motueka and then Nelson Bays at a provincial level, and was a member of the New Zealand national side, the All Blacks, in 1972 and 1973. He played 23 matches for the All Blacks including three internationals.

References

1942 births
Living people
People educated at Nelson College
University of Canterbury alumni
New Zealand rugby union players
New Zealand international rugby union players
New Zealand schoolteachers
Nelson Bays rugby union players
Golden Bay-Motueka rugby union players
Rugby union fullbacks
Rugby union players from Nelson, New Zealand